Bruce Crampton (born 28 September 1935) is an Australian professional golfer.

Early life
Crampton was born in Sydney, New South Wales, and attended Kogarah High School from 1948 to 1950. In August 1953 he reached final of the New South Wales Amateur Championship, losing 5&4 to Harry Berwick.

Professional career
Crampton turned professional in late 1953, becoming an assistant to Billy McWilliam at Beverley Park in Sydney. His decision to turn professional came soon after he had been left out of the Australian amateur team to tour Britain in 1954 and play in the Commonwealth Tournament at St Andrews.

Crampton won the Vardon Trophy for the player with the lowest stroke average on the PGA Tour in 1973 and 1975. He had 14 career wins on the PGA Tour between 1961 and 1975 and was runner up in four major championships – one Masters, one U.S. Open, and two PGA Championships – all to Jack Nicklaus. He was ranked among the top five golfers in the world in both 1972 and 1973, according to Mark McCormack's world golf rankings. His other regular career victories included the Australian Open, New Zealand PGA Championship, Far East Open and the Philippine Open. As a senior, he won 20 times on the Champions Tour, and topped the money list in 1986, but he did not win a senior major.

Crampton was inducted into the Sport Australia Hall of Fame in 2001.

Professional wins (45)

PGA Tour wins (14)

PGA Tour playoff record (0–2)

PGA Tour satellite wins (1) 

 1968 West End Classic

Australian/New Zealand circuit wins (6)
this list may be incomplete
1954 New Zealand PGA Championship
1956 Australian Open, Speedo Tournament
1957 Pelaco Tournament
1958 North Coast Open
1971 Wills Masters

Asian circuit wins (2) 
1959 Far East Open, Philippine Open

Senior PGA Tour wins (20)

*Note: The 1986 Pepsi Senior Challenge was shortened to 36 holes due to rain.

Senior PGA Tour playoff record (2–2)

Other senior wins (2)
1987 Liberty Mutual Legends of Golf (with Orville Moody)
1988 Liberty Mutual Legends of Golf (with Orville Moody)

Results in major championships

CUT = missed the half-way cut
"T" indicates a tie for a place

Summary

Most consecutive cuts made – 33 (1961 U.S. Open – 1973 Masters)
Longest streak of top-10s – 2 (twice)

Team appearances
Amateur
Australian Men's Interstate Teams Matches (representing New South Wales): 1953

Professional
World Cup (representing Australia): 1957, 1963, 1964, 1967, 1972
Slazenger Trophy (representing British Commonwealth and Empire): 1956
Vicars Shield (representing New South Wales): 1956 (winners)

See also
List of golfers with most Champions Tour wins

References

External links

Australian male golfers
PGA Tour golfers
PGA Tour of Australasia golfers
PGA Tour Champions golfers
Sport Australia Hall of Fame inductees
Golfers from Sydney
1935 births
Living people